65P/Gunn is a periodic comet in the Solar System which has a current orbital period of 6.79 years.

It was discovered on 11 October 1970 by Professor James E. Gunn of Princeton University using the 122-cm Schmidt telescope at the Palomar Observatory. It had a low brightness of magnitude 16 plus which improves to 12 under favourable conditions.

The comet is a short-period comet, orbiting the Sun every 6.79 years inside the main asteroid belt between the orbits of the planets Mars and Jupiter.

On 4 February 1970 the comet passed  from Ceres.

In 1972 Elizabeth Roemer managed to observe 65P/Gunn close to aphelion.

See also
 List of numbered comets

References

External links 
 Orbital simulation from JPL (Java) / Horizons Ephemeris
 65P at Kronk's Cometography
 65P/Gunn – Seiichi Yoshida @ aerith.net
 65P at Las Cumbres Observatory (26 Jun 2010 11:16, 150 seconds)

Periodic comets
0065
Comets in 2017
19701011